The Christian Palmarian Church of the Carmelites of the Holy Face, also called the Palmarian Christian Church, the Palmarian Church, or the Palmarian Catholic Church, is an independent Catholic church with an episcopal see in El Palmar de Troya, Spain, founded in 1978 by Clemente Domínguez y Gómez (known as Pope Gregory XVII). The church does not recognize any popes after Paul VI as Catholic, and holds that the Palmarian Christian Church has continued the papacy.

The church regards Pope Paul VI, whom they revere as a martyr, and his predecessors as true popes, but hold, on the grounds of claimed apparitions, that the Pope of Rome is excommunicated and that the position of the Holy See has, since 1978, been transferred to their See of El Palmar de Troya.

The current pope is Joseph Odermatt, known as Pope Peter III.

Scholars, journalists and former followers almost universally describe the organization as a cult. Members are expected not to watch any films or television, vote or read newspapers. They also engage in heavy shunning of former members and are not allowed to talk to people unrelated to the Palmarian Christian Church.

History

Origins

Consecration of bishops

Gregory XVII: claim to the papacy
In his capacity as pope, Domínguez (Pope Gregory XVII) called the Catholic Church a false church and declared Pope John Paul II excommunicated. Gregory XVII canonized the explorer Christopher Columbus, General Francisco Franco and founder of Opus Dei Josemaría Escrivá; and declared Paul VI a martyr and saint in the Palmarian Christian faith.

Peter II

Peter II died on July 15, 2011, after a long illness.

Gregory XVIII
Peter II was succeeded in 2011 by his Secretary of State, Ginés Jesús Hernández, who took the name Gregory XVIII. He abdicated the papacy on April 22, 2016. Earlier known as a hardliner, making several rules much stricter, towards the end of his papacy, he abolished some of them. For example, he allowed Palmarians to smoke, to go to the cinema (although immoral and pornographic films were still banned) and to talk to non-Palmarian people (as long as they had never been part of the Church). Hernández abdicated from his papacy on 22 April 2016 to marry Nieves Trivedi (a Palmarian nun), and was succeeded on 23 April 2016 by Odermatt who took Peter III as his papal name. Following his abdication, Hernández told El País that the Palmarian Christian Church "was all a hoax from the beginning" to profit from believers and supporters of the alleged apparitions of Our Lady of Palmar, and in 2020 expressed regret over not dissolving the church when he was pope. His successor, Pope Peter III, published an encyclical letter in response, in which he accused Hernández of discrediting his former Church in his interview and of stealing two million euros from the Palmarian Catholic Church, alongside several goods (including a BMW X6): he subsequently declared him an apostate, excommunicated him and declared all of his acts to be null and void. Hernández denies the charges of stealing. He and his wife subsequently reconciled with the Roman Catholic Church.

Peter III

After the abdication of Gregory XVIII, a new pope was elected in the Palmarian Church on April 23, 2016. As expected it was Swiss Joseph Odermatt, who was previously Gregory XVIII's Secretary of State. Odermatt adopted the papal name Peter III.

Odermatt disbanded the papal guard corps instituted by his predecessor, deeming it unnecessary for his security. In 2018 he travelled to the United States for the first time.

During his office, the Palmarian Christian Church established an online presence for the first time, opening a website and accounts on Facebook, Instagram, Twitter, Pinterest and a channel on YouTube.

Present

In a sermon delivered in August 2011, Gregory XVIII said that the Palmarian Church had between 1,000 and 1,500 members, but in the following years many were excommunicated. In 2015 the number of bishops was probably down to about 30 and the number of nuns were around 30. According to Magnus Lundberg, "except for at the very beginning, most new members were children of Palmarian couples and not people coming from outside". , 32 bishops remained out of 192 men who were consecrated as bishops between 1976 and 2015, according to Lundberg.

During the papacy of Pope Peter III, the church established an online presence for the first time, opening a website and accounts on Facebook, Instagram, Twitter and Pinterest and a channel on YouTube.

In January 2021, during the COVID-19 pandemic in Spain, it was reported that there were 70 positives, including 4 deaths, within the church premises. The rate of COVID-19 cases in El Palmar was 3,713 cases/100,000 inhabitants, triggering confinement measures for the town in spite of the reduced contact between the church members and the rest of the town. In September 2021, the Palmarian Catholic Church introduced new rules that made the wearing of anti-Covid masks compulsory to attend Mass.

Traditions

Bible 
As explained by professor Magnus Lundberg (Uppsala University), in 1997 Clemente Domínguez claimed that Prophet Elijah had appeared to him, claiming that the current Bible is "filled with errors that had been introduced by judeo-masonic groups through the centuries" and that it was his mission to revise it. Therefore, after 4 years of work, the Holy Palmarian Bible was published in five volumes in 2001, followed by a smaller two-volumes versions and an illustrated version for children. According to Lundberg, the changes were "dramatic": entire parts of the biblical books were omitted and numerous parts are "almost unrecognizable due to the allegorical and apocalyptical interpretations, which Gregory [i.e. Clemente Domínguez] claimed reflected the original intentions of the divine author. All of this makes the work very different from the traditional Bibles, both in structure and content" states Lundberg.

The Bible now used by the Palmarian Christian Church is not available in public libraries and is not available online. However, in 2018 Professor Lundberg scanned one of the English versions and later published it on his blog.

Saints
Saints canonized by the Palmarian Catholic Church include Christopher Columbus, Galileo Galilei, Francisco Franco, Francisco Jiménez de Cisneros, José Antonio Primo de Rivera, José Calvo Sotelo, Josemaría Escrivá, Luis Carrero Blanco, Pelagius of Asturias.

An internet hoax claiming that the Palmarians had canonised Adolf Hitler originated on a fabricated Palmarian blogging site and was disseminated through Wikipedia and other media; the Palmarian Catholic Church has denied the claim. According to the religious studies scholar Magnus Lundberg, the leadership of the Palmarian Catholic Church treat the continued spread of the hoax as evidence that the media and the internet have been coopted by enemies of the church.

Palmarian popes
Palmarian Christians generally accept the conventional succession of Catholic popes up to Paul VI but reject the conventional succession after him. As of 2020, none of Gregory XVII's successors have been elected by a Palmarian conclave, but were appointed as successors by the previous pope.

Headquarters
The church's walled compound, near the village of El Palmar de Troya, surrounds the Cathedral-Basilica of Our Crowned Mother of Palmar which contains the Palmarian popes' cathedra and at least 15 altars.

Controversy
Sergio María Hernández left his position as Pope Gregory XVIII in 2016 to marry a woman (who was a Palmarian nun) and told El País that the Palmarian Catholic Church "was all a hoax from the beginning" to profit from believers and supporters of the alleged apparitions of Our Lady of Palmar. In response, the new Pope Peter III published an encyclical letter, in which he accused Hernández of discrediting his former church in that interview, and of stealing two million euros from the Palmarian Catholic Church, along with goods including a BMW X6; Peter III subsequently declared Hernández an apostate, excommunicated him and declared all of his acts to be null and void. Hernández denies the charges of stealing. He and his wife later both reconciled with the Roman Catholic Church.

In 2020 Hernández was interviewed by El Confidencial: during the interview he accused the Palmarian Christian Church of possessing large quantities of cash and even weapons in some hidden places of the Cathedral-Basilica of Our Crowned Mother of Palmar; he also regretted not disbanding the church while he was in charge, but predicted that it would soon collapse on its own.

Bibliography 

 Magnus Lundberg, A Pope of their Own, Uppsala University, 2017.

See also
 Apostles of Infinite Love
 Conclavism
 Sedevacantism

References

 The original version of this article was adapted from

Further reading 

 Marcus Lundberg; A Pope of their Own: El Palmar de Troya and the Palmarian Church. 
 Palmar de Troya-Holy Catholic Palmarian Church (report by Magnus Lundberg, Uppsala University)

External links

 Official Website of the Palmarian Church

Christian denominations established in the 20th century
Christian organizations established in 1978
Churches in Spain
Independent Catholic denominations
Province of Seville
Traditionalist Catholicism
Conclavism